Majaz - Ae Gham-e-Dil Kya Karun is a 2017 Indian Hindi-language biographical-drama film directed by Ravindra Singh and produced by Shakeel Akhtar. It stars Priyanshu Chatterjee as the titular Majaz, an Indian Urdu poet and Rashmi Mishra as Nazia, his love interest. It was released on 20 January 2017.

Cast

 Priyanshu Chatterjee as Majaz
 Rashmi Mishra as Nazia
 Anas Khan as Hashim
 Kajal Raghwani as Meena Bai
 Neelima Azeem as Nabi
 Shahab Khan as Asim

Music
"Ae Gham-e-Dil (Title Song)" - Talat Aziz
"Allah O Ghani (Sufiyana)" - Sonu Nigam
"Barbad Ae Tamana" - Talat Aziz
"Chalo Re Sakhi" - Sugandha
"Dekhna Jazbe Mohabbat" - Talat Aziz
"Husn Ko Behijab" - Talat Aziz
"Kuch Tujko Khabar (Female)" - Alka Yagnik
"Kuch Tujko Khabar (Male)" - Talat Aziz
"Teskin -e Dil" - Talat Aziz
"Ye Mera Chaman" - Talat Aziz

Reception
The film received negative reviews in Times of India and The Free Press Journal.

References

2010s Hindi-language films
Films scored by Talat Aziz
2010s Urdu-language films
Indian biographical drama films
Indian films based on actual events